The Toven Tunnel is a  road tunnel connecting Leirfjord and Vefsn municipalities, both in Nordland county in northern Norway. The tunnel is also the main access to the city of Sandnessjøen. Work on the tunnel started in 2010 and it was opened on 22 November 2014. It is the longest tunnel in Northern Norway.

The tunnel replaces a narrow, steep, twisting road along the Vefsnfjorden to the south of the tunnel.

References

Road tunnels in Nordland
2014 establishments in Norway
Tunnels completed in 2014
Vefsn
Leirfjord
Toll tunnels in Norway